Relations between Algeria and the Holy See have been tensions in the relationship in recent years due to criticism of the Algerian government by the Vatican and increasing restrictions imposed on Algerian Catholics.

Algerian independence 
During the Algerian War of 1954-1962 the Holy See accepted the occupation of Algeria by the French colonial empire, and did not speak out in favor of Algerian independence despite pleas from the Algerian rebels to mediate. After Algeria became independent most of the French settlers left the country. However, Algeria generally retained close relationships with France, maintained diplomatic ties with the Holy See and allowed Roman Catholic priests to continue ministering to the remaining Catholics in Algeria.

Official relationship

Although Islam is the state religion of Algeria, the Holy See has maintained a comparatively good relationship with the Algerian authorities, with Léon-Étienne Duval being famously recognized as the bishop of Muslims after the departure of French colonists.

The Algerian state has sought to clearly distinguish between the Catholic religion, which is licit in Algeria with limitations to proselytism, and between Evangelical sects, which are officially forbidden and legally repressed by state powers. However, since a 2006 law limited religious worship to government-approved buildings, more than a dozen Catholic churches have been closed, and several priests have been jailed under new provisions that call for a more strict application of Islamic law.

Recent events

In 1996, seven Cistercian monks were killed by Islamist extremists, followed by the death of Roman Catholic bishop Pierre Claverie when a bomb exploded at his residence.
Details of the deaths are still disputed by the Vatican. Concerned by mounting violence, the Vatican issued a harsh criticism of the government handling of the crisis in September 1997, saying that "for too long, the international community has looked on with detachment at the tragedy that is systematically bloodying" Algeria. On January 8, 1998, the Vatican's official daily newspaper called upon the international community to help bring an end to the "genocide" in Algeria.

On the death of Pope John Paul II in April 2005, the president of Algeria Abdelaziz Bouteflika attended the funeral.

Following remarks by Pope Benedict XVI in Regensberg on 12 September 2006 which were widely interpreted as being offensive to the Muslim religion, the Foreign Affairs minister asked the Vatican's ambassador to provide explanations of these statements. The Algerian Association of Koranic Doctors called on Muslim countries to withdraw their ambassadors from Vatican City in protest.

In March 2017 Pope Francis appointed White Fathers missionary M. Afr. John MacWilliam as bishop of the Roman Catholic Diocese of Laghouat, covering the largely Saharan inland of Algeria. MacWilliaam had risen to the rank of major in the British army through 18 years of service, was ordained a priest in 1991, and joined the White Fathers after the assassination of four of its members in Tizi Ouzou, Algeria. He had become known for his efforts at building bridges with the Muslim community.

See also 
 Catholic Church in Algeria
 Foreign relations of the Holy See
 Foreign relations of Algeria
 Religion in Algeria

References 

 
Holy See
Bilateral relations of the Holy See